Dheeraj Sharma is a professor of management. He has been director of the Indian Institute of Management Rohtak since 2017, and is also a full professor on leave from Indian Institute of Management Ahmedabad. 

Sharma has advised the prisons department of Punjab, state of Gujarat and state of Delhi on marketing of goods made by prisoners and modernisation of jails, and has advised the Border Security Force and Central Reserve Police Force on stress avoidance, perception management, and effectiveness. 

In 2019, Sharma received the Education Leadership Award for his work as Director, IIM, Rohtak.

Sharma is member of economic advisory council of Haryana and a member of the task force for prospective and planning under the aegis of Haryana Governance Reforms Authority Haryana.

Research 
Sharma has been conferred the award of global thought leader by the Academy of Global Business Advancement, USA in 2019.

Books 
 Principles of Marketing
 Business to Business Marketing
 Leadership Lessons from the Military
 Consumer Behaviour
 Films and traditions
 Cross Cultural Perspectives in a Global Marketplace
 Proceedings of the 2007 Academy of Marketing Science (AMS) Annual Conference
 Cultural Perspectives in a Global Marketplace: Proceedings of the 2010 Cultural Perspectives in Marketing Conference
Global Business
 Swinging the Mandate: Developing and Managing a Winning Campaign

References

Living people
Louisiana Tech University alumni
Ball State University faculty
Year of birth missing (living people)